Colonia Claudia (Latin for "Claudian colony") may refer to:

 Colonia Claudia Ara Agrippinensium ("The Claudian colony at the Altar of the Agrippians"), the Roman settlement at Cologne also known as Colonia Agrippina
 Colonia Copia Claudia Augusta Lugdunum ("The Prosperous Imperial Claudian colony at Lugdunum"), the Roman settlement at Lyon also known as Lugdunum
 Colonia Claudia Caesarea ("The Caesarian Claudian colony"), the Roman settlement at Cherchell also known as Caesarea Mauretaniae
 Colonia Claudia Victricensis ("The Victorious Claudian colony"), the Roman settlement at Colchester also known as Camulodunum